Qabalan is a Palestinian town in the Nablus Governorate in the eastern West Bank, located  southeast of Nablus. According to the Palestinian Central Bureau of Statistics (PCBS), the town had a population of 7,130 inhabitants in 2007.

Location
It is bordered by Aqraba and Jurish to the east, Talfit and As Sawiya to the south, As Sawiya and Yatma to the west, and Beita and Osarin to the north.

History
Potsherds from the  Iron Age I and  Iron Age II have been found here.

The SWP noted that: "the ruin to the east [of the village] consists of heaps of stones".

Ottoman era
The population was 4 households, all Muslim. They paid a  fixed  tax rate of 33,3% on agricultural products, such as  wheat, barley, olive trees, goats and beehives, in addition to occasional revenues and a fixed tax for people of Nablus area; a total of 2,410 akçe. Sherds from the early Ottoman era have also been found here.

In 1838 Edward Robinson noted  Kubalan  on the south side of the valley, "surrounded by vineyards and large groves of olive and fig trees." It was  located in El-Beitawy district, east of Nablus.

In 1882, the PEF's Survey of Western Palestine (SWP) described  Kubalan as: "a  village of moderate size, on high ground, with olives round it, and wells."

British Mandate era
In the 1922 census of Palestine, conducted by the British Mandate authorities, Qabalan had a population of 771  Muslims, increasing in the 1931 census  to 936 Muslims, in 207  houses. 

In the 1945 statistics  Qabalan had a population of 1,310, all Muslims,  with 8,290  dunams of land, according to an official land and population survey. Of this, 3,948  dunams were plantations and irrigable land, 2,383 were used for cereals, while 72 dunams were built-up land.

Jordanian era
In the wake of the 1948 Arab–Israeli War, and after the 1949 Armistice Agreements, Qabalan came  under Jordanian rule.

The Jordanian census of 1961 found 1,867 inhabitants.

1967, aftermath

Since the Six-Day War in 1967, Qabalan has been under Israeli occupation  along with the rest of the Palestinian territories.

After the 1995 accords,  67% of the village land is in Area B, while the remaining 33% is in Area C. There have been a number of attacks on the people of Qabalan, their land and property from the nearby Israeli settlements.

References

Bibliography

External links
http://qabalan.org
 Welcome to Qabalan
Survey of Western Palestine, Map 14:   IAA,  Wikimedia commons
 Qabalan town profile,  Applied Research Institute–Jerusalem (ARIJ)
 Qabalan, aerial photo, ARIJ
 Development Priorities and Needs in Qabalan, ARIJ

Towns in the West Bank
Municipalities of the State of Palestine